IDFC Project Equity is a finance company based in India and subsidiary of Infrastructure Development Finance Company Limited (IDFC).

IDFC Project Equity manages the India Infrastructure Fund (IIF), a SEBI-registered domestic venture capital fund focused on infrastructure with a corpus of INR 35 billion (US$875 million). IIF focuses on investing equity for the long-term in a diversified portfolio of infrastructure assets in India.

History
IDFC Project Equity Company Limited is a wholly owned subsidiary of IDFC. It was set up as part of the 'India Infrastructure Financing Initiative', a collaboration between the Government of India and financial institutions to deploy US$5 billion in capital for infrastructure projects in India.

References

External links
 IDFC Project Equity Company
 IDFC - Infrastructure Development Finance Company

Investment management companies of India
Mutual funds of India
Private equity firms
Financial services companies based in Mumbai
2008 establishments in Maharashtra